The Sutagao are the Chibcha-speaking indigenous people from the region of Fusagasugá, Bogotá savanna, Cundinamarca, Colombia. Knowledge about the Sutagao has been provided by scholar Lucas Fernández de Piedrahita.

Etymology 
The name Sutagao is derived from the Chibcha words Su(t)á; "Sun" and gao; "son"; "Sons of the Sun".

Municipalities belonging to Sutagao territories 
The Sutagao was a relatively small indigenous group that lived between the Sumapaz Páramo and the Pasca River.

History 
Before the Spanish conquest, the Sutagao were in conflict with the Muisca to the northeast. Zipa Saguamanchica conquered the Sutagao around 1470 when the cacique of the Sutagao lost the Battle of Pasca. Conquistador Hernán Pérez de Quesada, brother of Gonzalo Jiménez de Quesada submitted the Sutagao to the new rule of the New Kingdom of Granada.

The Sutagao inhabited the region until a new town was founded by Bernardino Albornoz between 5 and 13 February in 1592. During the visit of Miguel de Ibarra there were 759 indigenous people residing in Fusagasugá.When Aróstequi arrived in February 1760, the indigenous population had dwindled to 85, and there were 644 new settlers divided among 109 families.

See also 

 Muisca 
 Guayupe, Panche

References 

Andean civilizations
Indigenous peoples in Colombia
Colombian culture